Tang Wei-tsu (born 25 July 1964) is a Taiwanese alpine skier. He competed at the 1988 Winter Olympics and the 1992 Winter Olympics.

References

1964 births
Living people
Taiwanese male alpine skiers
Olympic alpine skiers of Taiwan
Alpine skiers at the 1988 Winter Olympics
Alpine skiers at the 1992 Winter Olympics
Place of birth missing (living people)